J. Lillian Vandevere (Jul 1885 – 10 May 1957) was an American author, composer, and music educator. She is best remembered today for her compositions for rhythm band and toy orchestra, and her work on the California State Series textbooks for music education.

Vandevere was born in Canton, Pennsylvania, to Clara H. and George W. Vandevere. She attended the University of Pennsylvania in 1914 and 1915. Vandevere taught kindergarten for 15 years, and became interested in using rhythm bands and toy orchestras to teach music to young children. By 1930, she had started publishing books, articles, and musical compositions.

Vandevere said that when students listen to music, they learn about "the preservation of individuality while contributing to the welfare of the group.. . . Let there be a toy orchestra in every kindergarten and primary grade, and let it include each and every child."

Vandevere's writing and musical compositions were published by Allan & Company, Art Publication Society, B. F. Wood Music Company, California State Department of Education, C. C. Birchard and Company, Carl Van Roy, F. A. Owen Publishing Company, G. Schirmer Inc., Oliver Ditson and Company, Rand McNally and Company,  and Theodore Presser Company. They include:

Articles/Short Story 

"The Defiance of Abigail," McClure Newspaper Syndicate Sep 1916
"Musical Education Through the Toy Orchestra," American Childhood Oct 1928
The Rented Christmas (short story)
"The Scope of the Toy Symphony Orchestra," School Music 30 No. 144 Mar-Apr 1929

Books 

A Pet for Peter: a Rand McNally Elf Book 
Birchard Choral Collections No. 2: Male Voices
Christmas Eve in the Playroom
Contest of the Nations: Directions for Dances (textbook)
Happy Singing (textbook with Peter W. Dykema and Gladys Pitcher)
Lavender's Blue: A Picture Score
Let Music Ring (textbook with Peter W. Dykema and Gladys Pitcher)
Mender Man: A Children's Play
Music Everywhere (California State Series textbook with M. Teresa Armitage; Peter W. Dykema; Gladys Pitcher and K. D. Stevens) 
Music in the Air (California State Series textbook with Peter W. Dykema; Gladys Pitcher, Martha Powell Setchell, and D. K. Stevens)
Our First Music (textbook with M. Teresa Armitage; Peter W. Dykema; Gladys Pitcher; and Floy Adele Rossman) 
Our Land of Song (textbook with M. Teresa Armitage; Peter W. Dykema; Gladys Pitcher and K. D. Stevens) 
Shall I Tell You, Mother? A Picture Score
Sing Out! (textbook with Peter W Dykema; Hazel Nohavec Morgan; Gladys Pitcher; Martha Powell Setchell; Herman F Smith; and D K Stevens)
Singing School series (textbook with Peter W. Dykema; Gladys Pitcher; Donald Franklin Main; Hazel Nohavec Morgan; Herman F. Smith; and Martha Powell Setchell) 
Toy Symphony Orchestra: Its Organization and Training

Operettas 

Bells of Beaujolais (dance directions by Vandevere; music by Louis Adolphe Coerne; text by David Gurden Stevens)
Dragon of Wu Foo (text by David Gurden Stevens)
Far Away Friends: an Operetta with Toy Orchestra
Flower of Venezia (with Ronald Dundas)
In Arcady (text by David Gurden Stevens)
Peggy and the Pirate (with Geoffrey F. Morgan)
Princess has a Birthday: a Toy Orchestra Operetta
Purple Pigeon (with Gladys Pitcher; libretto by Irene Alexander)
Tale of the Toys: a Christmas Operetta for Children (with Gladys Pitcher) 
Witch of Brocken (with Louis Gruenberg and Emil Ferdinand Malkowsky)

Piano 

Animal Suite
Autumn
Gingerbread Man
Here Comes the Train
In Holland
Pedro and Pepita: A Dialogue
Play and Sing Book (40 pieces)
Polish Holiday: Mazurka (six hands) 
Scouts
Spain by Starlight
Spanish Guitars
Tango at Twilight
Wooden Shoes

Rhythm Band 

Allegro from Sonatine Opus 36 No. 1 (percussion instruments; Muzio Clementi arr. by Vandevere)
Andante from the Surprise Symphony (percussion instruments and piano; Joseph Haydn arr. by Vandevere) 
Ballet Music and other excerpts (percussion instruments and piano; Franz Schubert arr. by Vandevere) 
Blossom, Rosebush
Children's Piece (Felix Mendelssohn; arr. by Vandevere) 
Come Join the Dance! (Alphons Czibulka; arr. by Vandevere and Bertha Remick)
For Lincoln's Birthday
Handbells for Manhattan (handbells) 
(Hansel and Gretel Excerpts) (Engelbert Humperdinck; arr. by Vandevere) 
In Holland Stands a House: a Dutch Folk Tune
Jump Jim Crow (Sigmund Romberg; arr. by Vandevere)
La Czarine (Louis Ganne; arr. by Vandevere)
Little Carnival: Polka Mazurka, opus 105 (Louis Streabbog pseud. Jean Louis Gobbaerts arr. by Vandevere) 
March (Alexis Hollaender arr. by Vandevere) 
March from the Nutcracker Suite (Peter Tchaikovsky; arr. by Vandevere) 
March Militaire (Franz Schubert; arr. by Vandevere) 
March of Fingall's Men, opus 39 no. 1 (Hugo Reinhold; arr. by Vandevere) 
New Rhythm Band Book
On the Beat
Polly Put the Kettle On: A Score for Rhythm Band with Pictures
Pussy Cat, Pussy Cat: A Picture Score (with W. Keith Elliott) 
Soldier's March (percussion instruments and piano; Robert Schumann arr. by Vandevere)  
Sound Sketches: with Rhythm Instruments
Swinging in the Lane
There was a Crooked Man: A Picture Score (with W. Keith Elliott) 
Vandevere Holiday Series (at least 14 separate pieces for various holidays) 
Waltz from Poet and Peasant and other excerpts (Franz von Suppé; arr. by Vandevere)

Toy Orchestra 

Album Leaf and other excerpts (Edvard Grieg; arr. by Vandevere) 
American Patriotic Medley
Andante from Surprise Symphony (Joseph Haydn; arr. by Vandevere) 
From the Days of Washington
General Bum-Bum (Ede Poldini; arr. by Vandevere)
Holiday Hook Up (Christmas) 
Our Country
St. Patrick's Day in the Morning (toy orchestra score with text) 
Toy Orchestra Travels in a Dozen Lands: Folk Tunes
Toy Symphony Orchestra
Whistler

Vocal 

Ambitious Sailor
Campfire (SAB) 
Come Spring (SA; with Gladys Pitcher) 
Gloria in Excelsis: A Christmas Carol (quartet with soprano solo; with Joseph Wagner) 
Hour of Dreaming (men's chorus; with Haydn M. Morgan; text by Reynaldo Hahn) 
In Empire Days (chorus; Henry Hadley arr. by Vandevere)
Long Ago and Faraway
Men of Harlech: Welsh Air (a capella TTBB; text by Theodor Koerner) 
Moonlight Serenade (SAB; text by Vandevere; melody by Riccardo Drigo; arr. by Harvey Worthington Loomis) 
My Spanish Guitar: College Song
Nocturne: Andantino (SAB; Edwin H. Lemare arr. by Gladys Pitcher and Vandevere)
Oh Cherish Love! (chorus; Franz Liszt arr. by Vandevere) 
Pickaninny Patter
Pilgrims: Cantata (soprano, alto, optional bass; with John V. Dethier) 
Reverence and Praise: Moonlight Sonata (chorus; Ludwig van Beethoven arr. by Haydn M. Morgan and Vandevere) 
Throughout All the Year (chorus) 
Wind of the West Cantata (SSA; text by Vandevere; music by Roy Spaulding Stoughton) 
Youth at the Brook (SSA; Franz Schubert arr. by Gladys Pitcher and Vandevere)

References 

American women composers
American writers
American music educators
1885 births
1957 deaths
Textbook writers